Mariners Centre of Excellence is the training ground and academy base of Central Coast Mariners, located in Tuggerah, Australia. It is used by the club's youth team and the Central Coast Mariners Academy as a training base and for matches, as well as by the club's senior team for training. The facility also has a stadium with a capacity of 3,000 people. The facility was purpose-built for the Central Coast-based club and is the club's home base.

History
Work on the site commenced in 2011.

Structure and facilities
The Mariners Centre of Excellence includes:

 2 full-size grass pitches and a 3,000 seat grandstand
 10 sports courts
 1 heated aquatic and hydrotherapy centre
 1 gymnasium
 1 educational learning centre
 1 medicine centre
 1 event centre

References

External links
Official Website of Central Coast Mariners
Soccerway page

Central Coast Mariners FC
Soccer venues in New South Wales